McGuirk is a surname. Notable people with the surname include:

Ambrose McGuirk, the first owner of the Milwaukee Badgers of the National Football League
Bernard McGuirk (1957–2022), the executive producer of the Imus in the Morning radio program
Bill McGuirk (1930–2001), actor a.k.a. William McGuirk
Leroy McGuirk (1910–1988), American wrestler and professional wrestling promoter
Mike McGuirk (born 1958), American professional wrestling personality
Patrick McGuirk (born 1967), American football player
Terry McGuirk, chairman of Major League Baseball's Atlanta Braves
Warren P. McGuirk (1906–1981), Director of Athletics at the University of Massachusetts Amherst

See also
Warren McGuirk Alumni Stadium, 17,000-seat multi-purpose stadium in Hadley, Massachusetts on the campus of the university